Egypt has participated in the Pan Arab Games nine times, with great success. Egypt did not participate in the 2nd, 5th & 6th editions of The Pan Arab Games in Beirut 1957, Damascus 1976 & Rabat 1985.

Overview

References

Egypt at multi-sport events
Pan Arab Games